Lawrence Township is one of the seventeen townships of Stark County, Ohio, United States.  The 2000 census found 8,321 people in the township.

Geography
Located in the northwestern corner of the county, it borders the following townships and municipalities:
New Franklin - north
Green - northeast corner
Jackson Township - east
Perry Township - southeast corner
Tuscarawas Township - south
Baughman Township, Wayne County - west
Chippewa Township, Wayne County - northwest, west of Clinton
Clinton - northwest, east of Chippewa Township

The City of Canal Fulton is surrounded by Lawrence Township, and the unincorporated communities of North Lawrence, Newman, and Urban Hill lie within the southern part of the township.

Name and history
Statewide, other Lawrence Townships are located in Lawrence, Tuscarawas, and Washington counties. In 1833, Lawrence Township contained 3 gristmills, 3 saw mills, 3 tanneries, and 2 stores.

Government
The township is governed by a three-member board of trustees, who are elected in November of odd-numbered years to a four-year term beginning on the following January 1. Two are elected in the year after the presidential election and one is elected in the year before it. There is also an elected township fiscal officer, who serves a four-year term beginning on April 1 of the year after the election, which is held in November of the year before the presidential election. Vacancies in the fiscal officership or on the board of trustees are filled by the remaining trustees.

Education
Lawrence Township is divided between three school districts. The northern half of the township is served by the Northwest Local School District, while the southern half is part of Tuslaw Local School District. A small area along Erie Avenue in the eastern part of the township is zoned to the Jackson Local School District.

References

External links
Township website
County website

Townships in Stark County, Ohio
Townships in Ohio